Duke Ferdinand Frederick Augustus of Württemberg (22 October 1763 – 20 January 1834) was a Habsburg Austrian general during the French Revolutionary Wars and Napoleonic Wars.

Early life 
He was born into the House of Württemberg as the fifth son of Frederick II Eugene, Duke of Württemberg and his wife, Princess Friederike of Brandenburg-Schwedt, niece of Frederick the Great.

Military career 
As a high-ranking nobleman, he started his military career as an Oberstleutnant in 1781. Promoted to General-major in 1788, he fought at Belgrade during the Austro-Turkish War. During the War of the First Coalition he led his troops at Neerwinden and was in command of the successful Siege of Condé in 1793.

In March 1796 Württemberg was promoted to Feldzeugmeister, but after he was defeated by the French at Altenkirchen that June, Archduke Charles, Duke of Teschen removed him from command. He was promoted to Feldmarschall in 1805 but for the remainder of his military career he held commands in the interior. He was Proprietor (Inhaber) of one Austrian infantry regiment from 1785 to 1809, then a second infantry regiment from 1809 until his death in 1834. His eldest brother became King Frederick I of Württemberg and a younger brother Duke Alexander of Württemberg was a general officer in the service of the Russian Empire.

Private life 
On 18 March 1795 in Sondershausen he married Princess Albertine of Schwarzburg-Sondershausen (1771-1829), whom he divorced in 1801. On 23 February 1817 in Marseille he was married for the second time to Princess Pauline Kunigunde Waldburga of Metternich-Winneburg (1772-1855), elder sister of Austrian statesman and diplomat Klemens von Metternich. He didn't have children.

Honours
 :
 Grand Cross of the Order of the Württemberg Crown
 Commander of the Military Merit Order; Grand Cross
 :
 Commander of the Military Order of Maria Theresa, 1793; Grand Cross, 1794
 Grand Cross of the Imperial Order of Leopold, 1809/10
 Grand Cross of the Order of St. Stephen, 1831
  Kingdom of Prussia: Knight of the Order of the Black Eagle, 24 September 1831

Ancestry

References

Notes

1763 births
1834 deaths
People from the Province of Pomerania
People from Trzebiatów
Generals of the Holy Roman Empire
Austrian generals
Austrian Empire military leaders of the French Revolutionary Wars
Austrian Empire commanders of the Napoleonic Wars
Nobility from Stuttgart
Ferdinand Frederick Augustus
Grand Crosses of the Military Order of Maria Theresa
Grand Crosses of the Order of Saint Stephen of Hungary
Sons of monarchs